Shamsher M. Chowdhury Bir Bikrom is a Bangladeshi diplomat and served as the Foreign Secretary of Ministry of Foreign Affairs from October 2001 to March 2005. He also served as the ambassador of Bangladesh to Sri Lanka, Germany, Vietnam and United States.

Background
Chowdhury was born in 1950 to Abdul Mubeen Chowdhury and Tahmeed-un-Nahar. His paternal home is in Sylhet District. He graduated with Bachelor of Arts degree from the Pakistan Military Academy and was commissioned in the Pakistan Army in 1969. He served in Jessore and Chittagong during his career with the Pakistan Army. Chowdhury actively participated in the War of Liberation of Bangladesh in 1971 and, for his bravery, was awarded the Gallantry Award "Bir Bikram" (BB). He attended the Senior Staff Course from 1988 to 1991 in the Public Administrative Training Centre in Savar and passed with distinction. Chowdhury speaks German and Italian, and has working knowledge of French.

Career
Chowdhury joined the Bangladesh Civil Service (Foreign Affairs) in January 1975. After serving as Deputy Chief of Protocol and Director (West Europe) in the Foreign Ministry from 1975 to 1977 he was posted to Bangladesh Embassy in Rome from 1977 to 1982. He served as Counselor in the Bangladesh Embassy in Washington from 1982 to 1983 and as Counsellor and Minister in the Bangladesh High Commission in Ottawa from 1983 to 1986. He served as Deputy Chief of Mission/Minister in the Bangladesh Embassy in Beijing from 1986 to 1988. Chowdhury represented Bangladesh in International Conferences in the FAO, World Food Programme  & Non-Aligned meetings. He was also member of the Bangladesh Delegation to several Commonwealth Summits and SAARC  Summits. He also represented Bangladesh in ICPE Assembly meetings in Slovenia.

Chowdhury served as the High Commissioner of Bangladesh to Sri Lanka from 1991 to 1995; as Ambassador of Bangladesh to the Federal Republic of Germany from 1995 to 1998; and as Ambassador to the Socialist Republic of Vietnam from 1998 to 2001. He served as Foreign Secretary from October 2001 to March 2005. Chowdhury finally served as Bangladesh Ambassador to United States from 2005 to 2007.

References

External links
 Profile of Shamsher M. Chowdhury from Ministry of Foreign Affairs
 Curriculum Vitae of Shamsher M. Chowdhury

Living people
Bangladeshi diplomats
Ambassadors of Bangladesh to the United States
Ambassadors of Bangladesh to Vietnam
Ambassadors of Bangladesh to Russia
Ambassadors of Bangladesh to Germany
High Commissioners of Bangladesh to Sri Lanka
World Food Programme people
Bangladeshi officials of the United Nations
1950 births
Recipients of the Bir Bikrom
People from Sylhet District
Notre Dame College, Dhaka alumni
Mukti Bahini personnel